Rhaphiptera avicenniae is a species of beetle in the family Cerambycidae. It was described by Dalens and Tavakilian in 2007. It is known from French Guiana and Brazil.

References

avicenniae
Beetles described in 2007